Joseph Brady (born September 23, 1989) is an American football coach who  is the quarterbacks coach for the Buffalo Bills of the National Football League (NFL). He previously served as the offensive coordinator for the Carolina Panthers from 2020 to 2021. He was a passing game coordinator and wide receiver coach for the LSU Tigers during the 2019 season, winning the Broyles Award for the best assistant coach in college football, and an offensive assistant for the New Orleans Saints from 2017 to 2018.

Early life
Son of Joe and Jodi, brother of Jacey (former Miami Dolphins cheerleader), Brady was born in Miami Lakes, Florida and grew up in Pembroke Pines, Florida where he was a four-year letterwinner as a wide receiver at Everglades High School.

Playing career
Brady spent four years as a wide receiver for the William & Mary Tribe from 2009–2012. As a junior, he appeared in all eleven games.

College statistics

Coaching career

New Orleans Saints
In 2017, Brady was hired by the New Orleans Saints as an offensive assistant under head coach Sean Payton.

LSU
In 2019, Brady joined head coach Ed Orgeron and the LSU Tigers as their passing game coordinator and wide receivers coach. Recognized as the top assistant coach during the 2019 college football season, Brady was honored with the 24th annual Broyles Award. Subsequently, he emerged as a leading candidate for numerous offensive coordinator vacancies in the NFL, but eventually agreed to a three-year contract extension with LSU.

Carolina Panthers
On January 16, 2020, Brady was hired by the Carolina Panthers as their offensive coordinator under head coach Matt Rhule.  The Panthers were selected to coach in the 2021 Senior Bowl, but Brady missed the game due to COVID-19 protocols. On December 5, 2021, Brady was fired by the Panthers.

Buffalo Bills
On February 4, 2022, Brady was hired by the Buffalo Bills as their quarterbacks coach, replacing Ken Dorsey after his promotion to offensive coordinator.

References

External links
LSU Tigers bio
William and Mary player profile

1989 births
Living people
American football wide receivers
Buffalo Bills coaches
Carolina Panthers coaches
LSU Tigers football coaches
National Football League offensive coordinators
New Orleans Saints coaches
Penn State Nittany Lions football coaches
Players of American football from Florida
Sportspeople from Pembroke Pines, Florida
William & Mary Tribe football coaches
William & Mary Tribe football players
Coaches of American football from Florida